PDZ domain-containing protein 11 is a protein that in humans is encoded by the PDZD11 gene.

References

Further reading